The Mitsubishi Ki-51 (Army designation "Type 99 Assault Plane"; Allied nickname "Sonia") was a light bomber/dive bomber in service with the Imperial Japanese Army during World War II. It first flew in mid-1939. Initially deployed against Chinese forces, it proved to be too slow to hold up against the fighter aircraft of the other Allied powers. However, it performed a useful ground-attack role in the China-Burma-India theater, notably from airfields too rough for many other aircraft. As the war drew to a close, the Japanese began using them in kamikaze attacks. Total production was around 2,385 units.

On the day Hiroshima was destroyed by an atomic bomb, a single Ki-51 was responsible for the last Japanese sinking of a US warship, sinking  with all hands.

Charles Lindbergh, flying a P-38 Lightning, shot down a Ki-51.

Variants
 Prototypes: two built
 Service trials: 11 built
 Ki-51: 2,372 built (Manufacturers: Mitsubishi (1,462), Tachikawa Army Air Arsenal (913)) until March 1944
 Ki-51A: reconnaissance version.
 Ki-51B: assault version with armor and bomb racks to carry  of bombs. It could also be fitted with an aerial camera.
 Mansyu Ki-71: three prototypes built by Mansyu with retractable landing gear, did not enter production.

Operators

 Imperial Japanese Army Air Force

 Indonesian Air Force - In late 1945, the Indonesian People's Security Army (TKR) captured some aircraft at Japanese bases, including Bugis Air Base in Malang. Most aircraft were destroyed during the Indonesian National Revolution of 1945–1949. Two Yokosuka K5Y "Cureng", and a Ki-51 "Guntei" carried out a bombing operation against the Dutch on July 29, 1947.

 Communist Chinese (captured): The last 4 of around 100 Ki-51s were retired in 1953.

 Following independence, transferred from the Soviet Union.

Specifications (Ki-51)

See also

Notes

Bibliography
  (new edition 1987 by Putnam Aeronautical Books, .)

External links

 Mitsubishi Ki 51 Sonia at Warbirds Resource Group
 Mitsubishi Ki 51 Sonia at Pilotfriend

Ki-051
1930s Japanese attack aircraft
Single-engined tractor aircraft
Low-wing aircraft
Ki-51, Mitsubishi
Aircraft first flown in 1939